Big City is a 1948 film.

Plot
An abandoned infant is discovered in New York City by a cantor, David Feldman, and a minister, Rev. Phillip Andrews, who consult police officer Pat O'Donnell about what to do. Taking in the baby girl and naming her Midge, the three unmarried men seek legal custody in the courtroom of Judge Martin O. Abercrombie, who is agreeable on one condition—the first man to marry will become sole legal guardian of the girl.

At school after she's a few years older, Midge is teased by others for her unusual family situation. Even her teacher, Florence Barrett, does not approve of a child being raised without a mother. To alleviate her concerns, the men invite Florence to an evening at their home, where even Midge becomes happier about the way she is being brought up.

David falls in love with Florence and hopes to propose marriage. Pat, who has been seeing the extroverted singer "Shoo Shoo" Grady, elopes with her. The two clergymen are unsure that Shoo Shoo would be a proper parent for their child. It is left up to the judge, who gives careful consideration to everyone's concerns, then solves the problem by withdrawing his condition about marriage, permitting all three men to share fatherly responsibilities to Midge equally.

Cast
 Margaret O'Brien as Midge
 Robert Preston as Rev. Andrews
 Danny Thomas as Cantor Feldman
 George Murphy as Pat O'Donnell
 Karin Booth as Florence Bartlett
 Edward Arnold as Judge Abercrombie
 Butch Jenkins as Lewis Keller
 Betty Garrett as "Shoo Shoo" Grady
 Lotte Lehmann as Mama Feldman
 Stanley Blystone as Mike (uncredited)
 Heinie Conklin as Barfly (uncredited)
 Frank Mayo as Lawyer (uncredited)

Reception
According to MGM records the movie was not a hit, earning $910,000 in the US and Canada and $489,000 elsewhere, making a loss to the studio of $850,000.

References

External links

Big City at TCMDB

1948 films
1948 drama films
American drama films
American black-and-white films
1940s English-language films
Films directed by Norman Taurog
Films set in New York City
Metro-Goldwyn-Mayer films
Films produced by Joe Pasternak
1940s American films